The Holy Metropolis of Chios, Psara and Oinousses is an Orthodox Christian diocese covering the Greek eastern Aegean islands of Chios, Psara, and Oinousses. As part of the "New Lands", it belongs to the jurisdiction of the Ecumenical Patriarchate of Constantinople, but its administration is carried out by the Church of Greece. Since 2011, the Metropolitan of Chios is Markos Vasilakis.

Charity
The Metropolis of Chios, Psara and Oinousses runs a welfare programme where volunteers organised by the church cook approximately 540 meals daily, 5 days a week. These meals are distributed to local parishes where it is then given to those in need, 40% of which are elders. In 2012, 2013, 2018 and 2020, separately, the Metropolis won food supply grants to feed approximately 300 elderly resident for 12 months.

In April 2020, as president of the Anti-Tuberculosis Association of Chios, Metropolitan Markos of Chios donated €6,000 to a Chios hospital along with an earlier donation of €20,000 towards SARS sampling and nursing infrastructure. This brings the total donated to the hospital at €26,000.

Bibliography

References

External links
Diocesan website (in Greek)

Chios
Dioceses of the Ecumenical Patriarchate of Constantinople
Dioceses of the Church of Greece
Eastern Orthodox dioceses in Greece